Brazda lui Novac is a Roman limes in present-day Romania, known also as Constantine's Wall.  It is believed by some historians like Alexandru Madgearu to border Ripa Gothica.

The vallum of Brazda lui Novac starts from Drobeta, nowadays it is visible to Ploiești. There is some evidence that the vallum eastern limit was the Siret River. The height of the vallum was 3 metres and the ditch was 2 metres deep. It is believed that the wall was raised during Tiberius Plautius Aelianus. Some historians such as Ioan Donat date the wall during the 1st century AD, others date the wall to 322 during Constantine I.

See also 
 Devil's Dykes
 Wall of Constantine in Constantinople
 Trajan's Wall

References 

Roman frontiers
Roman fortifications in Dacia
Roman fortifications in Romania